RBW (an acronym for Rainbow Bridge World) is a South Korean entertainment company founded by Kim Jin-woo (Hangul: 김진우) and Kim Do-hoon (Hangul: 김도훈) The company has multiple subsidiaries, including Cloud R, RBW Vietnam, All Right Music, RBW Japan, WM Entertainment, and DSP Media.

History

2010–2014: Early formation and debut of Mamamoo
Kim Jin-woo originally was the representative director of Cube Entertainment's Music Cube. Kim Jin-woo was in charge of the practice room rental business and then expanded his business with opening AN Bridge, Rainbow Bridge Academy and ENB Academy Practical Music Academy, which integrated under the name Modern & Bridge. On March 5, 2010, he later established the first OEM company, Rainbow Bridge Agency, which operates to train students who are not trainees with similar process as the regular entertainment company, such as vocal, dance, acting, language, etc.

In August 2011, Hwang Sung-jin (former Music Cube producer) and Kim Do-hoon (former Music Cube director) joined Kim Jin-woo's Modern & Bridge and took representative and director positions.

In March 2012, Kim Do-hoon joined corporation with Rainbow Bridge Agency’s established music label, WA Entertainment.

On August 16, 2012, WA Entertainment along with Brand New Music debuted Hip hop trio Phantom. In December 2012, Hip hop duo Geeks signed with WA Entertainment.

On June 18, 2014, WA Entertainment debuted its first girl group Mamamoo.

In August 2014,  WA Entertainment debuted composer Esna as a solo singer. 
In September 2014, WA Entertainment along with TSN Entertainment debuted brother duo OBROJECT.

2015–present: Merger into RBW, debut of Oneus and Onewe, and subsidiaries
In March 2015, WA Entertainment merged with Rainbow Bridge Agency to create an independent label RBW (acronym for Rainbow Bridge World). In September 2015, Yangpa signed with RBW. In December 2015, rapper Basick and Big Tray signed with RBW.

In June 2016, Monday Kiz signed with RBW. On July 12, 2016, RBW debuted vocal group Vromance.

On June 9, 2017, RBW confirmed that rock band M.A.S 0094 joined the label, as well as the changing of the band name to MAS (acronym for Make A Sound).

In June 2018, RBW revealed that MAS would re-debut under the name "Onewe" and RBW BOYZ as "Oneus". Oneus debuted as a six-member group on January 9, 2019, and Onewe re-debuted on May 13.

In October 2018, RBW debuted Jin-Ju as a soloist in South Korea and Vietnam.

In February 2020, RBW Vietnam debuted D1verse, the first Vietnamese musical group under a Korean label.

On March 15, 2021, RBW debuted the 7-member girl group Purple Kiss.

On April 7, 2021, it was announced that RBW purchased the 70% shares of WM Entertainment, which houses idol groups such as B1A4 and Oh My Girl. They will be merged into RBW as a subsidiary.

On June 11, 2021, RBW issued a statement confirming that Wheein would not renew her exclusive contract with the agency, although she will continue to promote with Mamamoo for group activities as she has signed an expanded agreement to participate in some activities, including albums and concerts, until December 2023.

On November 22, 2021, RBW began public offering on KOSDAQ.

On January 26, 2022, it was announced that RBW purchased the 39.1% shares of DSP Media, which houses idol groups such as Kard and Mirae. They will be merged into RBW as a subsidiary. Kim Jin-woo, founder and CEO of RBW, has also become a CEO of DSP Media.

On December 29, 2022, it was announced that RBW acquired 50 percent of Urban Works for 10 billion won ($7.88 million) to become the largest shareholder of the production house. The deal was signed on Jan. 2 and the payment will be made in full by the first half of 2023.

Subsidiaries

Sub-labels

Cloud R
On May 27, 2016, RBW joint cooperation with Lee Seong-yeon established the independent sub-label. It was house to M.A.S 0094, a 5-member rock band managed by Modern Music. Its management was transferred to RBW in 2017 and they redebuted as Onewe in 2019 under the main label.

All Right Music
All Right Music is an independent Hip hop label headed by rapper Basick and RBW producer Im Sang-hyuk.Established in March 2017, the label was set up by RBW to focused hip hop scene. It was introduced their first artist: Big Tray, Marvel J and B.O.

RBW Vietnam
In 2016, RBW established a sub agency in Vietnam, joint-ventured with Naver, for future auditions and artist development in the region. The label introduced its first artist Jin Ju, a Korean student who won on the Vietnamese singing competition program Masked Singer, in 2018 with her debut single "Petal", released in both Korean and Vietnamese.

RBW launched the Vietnamese boy band D1Verse in February 2020. The group was formed by an all-Vietnamese cast and it was the first vocal group in Vietnam to be produced and managed by a K-pop label.

RBW Japan
In 2017, RBW established a sub agency in Japan for future auditions and artist development in the region. RBW announced Mamamoo's Japan debut in October 2018, working with local label Victor Entertainment as its music distributor, followed by Oneus and Onewe in 2019, distributed by Kiss Entertainment and Gem records respectively.

In 2020, RBW Japan announced the formation of the male-trainee band "RBW JBOYZ". It is the first all-Japanese band under RBW.

Modern RBW
RBW producer Kim Hyunkyu and Modern K Music Academy combined to form a new sub-label "Modern RBW" which aims to promote aspiring artists to try get recognised with a projects series release of singles.

WM Entertainment
On April 7, 2021, RBW announced that they have acquired WM Entertainment, the agency of groups Oh My Girl, B1A4, ONF and soloist Lee Chae-yeon. The two companies aim to work on creating synergy through close cooperation. With this acquisition, WM Entertainment will operate as an independent label of RBW and maintain its current management.

DSP Media
On January 26, 2022, RBW announced that they have acquired DSP Media, the agency of groups Kard and Mirae. The two companies aim to work on creating synergy through close cooperation. With this acquisition, DSP Media will operate as an independent label of RBW and maintain its current management.

Urban Works Media
On December 29, 2022, RBW announced that they will acquired 50 percent of Urban Works for 10 billion won ($7.88 million) to become the largest shareholder of the production house. The deal will be signed on Jan. 2 and the payment will be made in full by the first half of 2023.

Recording artists

RBW

Groups
Kara
Mamamoo
Vromance 
Oneus 
Onewe 
Purple Kiss

Soloists
Moonbyul
Hwasa
Solar

Notable trainees
RBW Jboyz (under RBW Japan)

WM Entertainment

Groups
B1A4
Oh My Girl
ONF

Soloists
Sandeul
YooA
Chaeyeon

DSP Media

Groups
 Kard
 Mirae

Soloists
 Heo Young-ji
 BM
 Rachel

Studio artists

RBW

Session musicians 
Rb-inj - String session, co-founded with I.N.J Orchestra.
Onewe - Also active as session musicians, both in studio recordings and live performances.

Record producers 
 Kim Do-hoon (김도훈) - Chief Executive Producer & co-CEO. Main Producer of Mamamoo. 
 Lee Sang-ho (이상호) - Director. Main Producer of Oneus, member of producing crew Masked Knights. 
 Hwang Sung-jin (황성진) - Director. Music Cube producer. 
 Kim Hyun-kyu (김형규) - Director. Also CEO of Modern K Practical Music Academy. 
 Kwon Suk-hong (권석홍) - Director. Music Director of Rb-inj. 
 Song Jun-ho (송준호) - Principal of Rainbow Bridge Music Academy, Director of WM Entertainment. 
 Park Woo-sang (박우상) - Member of Masked Knights. 
 Seo Yong-bae (서용배) - Member of Masked Knights and producing duet Igi-yongbae. 
 Choi Gap-won (최갑원)
 Choi Yong-chan (최용찬) - Also active as indie singer-songwriter lunCHbox. 
 Yun Young-jun (윤영준)
 Im Sang-hyuck (임상혁) - A.k.a. Leemssang. President of All Right Music, member of producing crew Firebat
 Jeon Da-woon (전다운) - Main Producer of Onewe, member of Firebat
 Kim Ki-hyun (김기현) - A.k.a. Cosmic Sound (코스믹 사운드), mainly co-produces with singer-songwriter Cosmic Girl.
 Mingki (밍키)
 Lee Hoo-Sang (이후상)
 Park Ji-young (박지영) - A.k.a. Davve, Main Producer of Purple Kiss.

Awards

2011
1st Korean Music Copyright Awards - Composer in Rock category  [CEO Kim Do Hoon, Lee Sang Ho]

2014
6th MelOn Music Awards - Best Songwriter  [CEO Kim Do Hoon]
4th Gaon Chart KPop Awards - Composer of the Year  [CEO Kim Do Hoon]

2015
1st KOMCA Awards - Grand Prize in Composition, Popular Music  [CEO Kim Do Hoon]
Korean Ministry of Commerce, Industry & Energy - Young Entrepreneur  [CEO Kim Jin Woo]
Seoul Metropolitan Police Agency - Commissioner's Commendation for Appreciation  [CEO Kim Jin Woo]

2016
Korea Business Management Awards - Best in Popular Culture  [CEO Kim Jin Woo]

2017
3rd KOMCA Awards - Grand Prize in Composition, Popular Music  [CEO Kim Do Hoon]
1st Soribada Best K-Music Awards - Best Producer  [Seo Yong Bae and Iggy]
Korea Entertainment Producers Association - Organizer of the Year  [CEO Kim Jin Woo]

2018
2nd Soribada Best K-Music Awards - Best Producer  [CEO Kim Do Hoon]
Vietnam V LIVE 2017 - Best Program Award  [CEO Kim Jin Woo]

2019
Korean Ministry of Culture, Sport, and Tourism - Minister's Prize  [CEO Kim Jin Woo]

2020
17th Korea Startup Award - Minister of Small and Medium Venture Business Award  [CEO Kim Jin Woo]
4th Soribada Best K-Music Awards - Best Producer  [CEO Kim Do Hoon]

Former artists 

RBW / WA Entertainment
 ESna (2014–2017)
 Yangpa (2015–2018)
 Monday Kiz (2016–2018)
 Mamamoo
 Wheein (2014–2021; moved to The L1ve, but continues to participate in certain group activities)
 Vromance
 Yoon Euno (formerly known as Lee Chandong, 2016-2022; moved to Gleam Artist to focus on his career as a musical actor)

Co-managed
 Geeks (2012–2016) (co-managed with How Entertainment; moved to Grandline Entertainment) 
 Phantom (2012–2017) (co-managed with Brand New Music; disbanded)
 P.O.P (2017–2018) (co-managed with DWM Entertainment; disbanded)
 OBROJECT (co-managed with TSN Entertainment) (2014-2019; disbanded)
 Co-managed with Duckfuss Entertainment (2020–2021)
 Kim Yuna 
 Obze
 OYEON

RBW Vietnam
Jin-Ju (2018–2020; moved to Krazy Sound)
D1Verse (2019-2021; Vietnam sub-label ceased operations in 2020, hence putting group activities in suspension, formally disbanded in 2021.)
Trần Bình (2019-2020; contract terminated over misconduct)

All Right Music
 Basick (2015–2018; founded Outlive)
 B.O. (2017–2020; founded MYFB.)
 Big Tray (2015-?)
 Marvel J (2017-?; moved to Luminant Entertainment)

Cloud R
 Mas (2017–2019; re-debuted as Onewe under the main label)

Notes

References

External links 

South Korean record labels
Talent agencies of South Korea
Record labels established in 2010
Music companies of South Korea
South Korean companies established in 2010
Companies based in Seoul